Ivan Polic (born 13 August 1973 in Serbia) is a Serbian retired footballer.

Career

At the age of 16, Polic immigrated to the United States, where he played club soccer.

In 1996, he returned to his hometown in Serbia to play for the local team in the third division. He then joined a second division side before signing for FK Radnički Niš in the top flight in 1997.

In 1999, Polic went back to the United States with his wife and earned a contract with LA Galaxy after training with them.

References

External links
 Ivan Polic at SoccerStats.us

Serbian footballers
Living people
Association football midfielders
1973 births
LA Galaxy players
Major League Soccer players